Daughters of Today is a 1924 American silent drama film directed by Rollin S. Sturgeon and starring Patsy Ruth Miller, Ralph Graves, and Edna Murphy.

Plot
As described in a film magazine review, Lois Whittall's father Leigh is interested in a young blonde charmer. Lois and her college friends are out for a good time and en route pick up Mabel Vandegrift, a young country woman who was very strictly reared by her parents. Their gay roadside party is wound up by a moonlight bathing frolic. The young people are then scattered by outraged villagers and they are in an automobile accident. Lois and Mabel then become mixed up in a murder mystery. In the end, it all comes out alright and the two young women find happiness with their respective lovers.

Cast

References

Bibliography
 Stumpf, Charles. ZaSu Pitts: The Life and Career. McFarland, 2010.

External links

1924 films
1924 drama films
1920s English-language films
American silent feature films
Silent American drama films
Films directed by Rollin S. Sturgeon
American black-and-white films
Selznick Pictures films
1920s American films